The 2018 World Junior Figure Skating Championships were held in Sofia,  Bulgaria from 5–11 March 2018.

Records 

The following new junior records were set during this competition:

Qualification

Minimum TES 
The ISU stipulates that the minimum scores must be achieved at an ISU-recognized junior international competition in the ongoing or preceding season, no later than 21 days before the first official practice day.

Number of entries per discipline 
Based on the results of the 2017 Junior World Championships, each ISU member nation fielded one to three entries per discipline.

Schedule

Entries 
Member nations began announcing their selections in December 2017. The International Skating Union published the full list of entries on 13 February 2018.

Changes to initial assignments

Results

Men 

The leader from the short program, Alexei Krasnozhon, sustained an injury on his first jumping pass, a quad Salchow, and subsequently withdrew from the competition.

Ladies 
Alexandra Trusova set a new junior world record for the free skating (153.49 points) landing a quadruple salchow and quadruple toe. She also set the new combined total record (225.52 points).

Pairs

Ice dance

Medals summary

Medalists 
Medals for overall placement:

Small medals for placement in the short segment:

Small medals for placement in the free segment:

By country 
Table of medals for overall placement:

Table of small medals for placement in the short segment:

Table of small medals for placement in the free segment:

References

Citations 

World Junior Figure Skating Championships
International figure skating competitions hosted by Bulgaria
Sports competitions in Sofia
World Junior Figure Skating Championships, 2018
World Junior Figure Skating Championships
World Junior Figure Skating Championships
World Junior Figure Skating